Stenopodius flavidus is a species of leaf beetle in the family Chrysomelidae. It is found in Central America and North America.

Subspecies
These two subspecies belong to the species Stenopodius flavidus:
 Stenopodius flavidus flavidus
 Stenopodius flavidus texanus Schaeffer

References

Further reading

 
 

Cassidinae
Articles created by Qbugbot
Beetles described in 1883